Simmtronics Infotech Pvt. Ltd is a multinational technology company, headquartered in India, operating in the segments of computer hardware manufacturing and development. It sells and supports computer related products such as Laptop Ram, Desktop Ram, Pen drive, and Micro SD cards.  

Simmtronics also processes, tests and resells hard disk drives under its label, originally manufactured by other suppliers (eg. Western Digital, Seagate). The company was founded in Delhi, India
Simmtronics has sales and subsidiary offices  in Algeria, France, Mauritius, Macedonia, Nepal, Singapore, Sri Lanka, Thailand, United Kingdom, United States, Vietnam and U.A.E.

History

In December 2010, VIA Technologies tied-up with Simmtronics as Exclusive Manufacturing and Distribution Partner for 'VIA pc-1' Mainboards in India, covering 15 other countries in SAARC, Middle East and Africa.

Products
The company's products include:

Desktop Ram
Laptop Ram
Pen Drive/Flash Drive
Micro SD Card

References

External links

Computer companies of India
Computer hardware companies
Computer memory companies
Electronics companies of India
Mobile phone manufacturers
Manufacturing companies based in Delhi
Computer companies established in 1992
Electronics companies established in 1992
Software companies established in 1992
Indian brands